The Stratford School District is a community public school district that serves students in pre-kindergarten through eighth grade from Stratford in Camden County, New Jersey, United States. Students from Laurel Springs attend the district's schools for grades 7 and 8 as part of a sending/receiving relationship. Students from Hi-Nella attend the district for PreK-8 as part of a sending/receiving relationship, under a five-year transition that started in 2012-13, bringing in an additional 100 students to the district.

As of the 2018–19 school year, the district, comprised of two schools, had an enrollment of 862 students and 69.1 classroom teachers (on an FTE basis), for a student–teacher ratio of 12.5:1.

The district is classified by the New Jersey Department of Education as being in District Factor Group "DE", the fifth-highest of eight groupings. District Factor Groups organize districts statewide to allow comparison by common socioeconomic characteristics of the local districts. From lowest socioeconomic status to highest, the categories are A, B, CD, DE, FG, GH, I and J.

For ninth grade through twelfth grade, public school students attend Sterling High School, a regional high school district that also serves students from Magnolia and Somerdale, along with the sending districts of Hi-Nella and Laurel Springs. The high school is located in Somerdale. As of the 2018–19 school year, the high school had an enrollment of 958 students and 69.8 classroom teachers (on an FTE basis), for a student–teacher ratio of 13.7:1.

Awards and recognition
Samuel S. Yellin School was recognized by Governor Jim McGreevey in 2003 as one of 25 schools selected statewide for the First Annual Governor's School of Excellence award.

Schools
Schools in the district (with 2018–19 enrollment data from the National Center for Education Statistics) are:
Elementary school
Parkview Elementary School with 367 students in pre-kindergarten through third grade
Michele Taylor, Principal
Brian Blumenstein, Vice Principal
Middle school
Samuel S. Yellin Elementary School with 487 students in grades 4 - 8
David L. Ricci, Principal
Brian Blumenstein, Vice Principal

Administration
Core members of the district's administration are:
Thomas Attanasi, Superintendent
Debra Trasatti, Business Administrator / Board Secretary

Board of education
The district's board of education, comprised of nine members, sets policy and oversees the fiscal and educational operation of the district through its administration. As a Type II school district, the board's trustees are elected directly by voters to serve three-year terms of office on a staggered basis, with three seats up for election each year held (since 2012) as part of the November general election. The board appoints a superintendent to oversee the district's day-to-day operations and a business administrator to supervise the business functions of the district. The board includes additional trustees from the sending districts, with one from Hi-Nella and one from Laurel Springs.

References

External links
Stratford School District

School Data for the Stratford School District, National Center for Education Statistics
Sterling High School

Stratford, New Jersey
Hi-Nella, New Jersey
Laurel Springs, New Jersey
New Jersey District Factor Group DE
School districts in Camden County, New Jersey